Cyrtodactylus ywanganensis is a species of gecko endemic to Myanmar.

References 

Cyrtodactylus
Reptiles described in 2018
Endemic fauna of Myanmar
Reptiles of Myanmar